Neergaard is a surname. Notable people with the surname include:

Bodil Neergaard (1867–1959), Danish estate owner, philanthropist and socialite
Carl Neergaard  (1800 –1850), Danish landowner and politician
Claus Marius Neergaard (1911–1990), Norwegian politician
Daeg Neergaard Faerch (born 1995), American actor, model, rapper and producer
Elna M. de Neergaard (1872–1946), Danish-born American textile artist
Hermania Neergaard (1799–1875), Danish flower and still-life painter
Joachim Neergaard (1877–1920), Danish composer
Joachim Wedell-Neergaard (1862–1926), Danish diplomat, landowner and chamberlain
John Neergaard (1795–1885), Norwegian farmer, bailiff, and politician
Mette de Neergaard (born 1991), Danish curler
Niels Neergaard (1854–1936), Danish historian and political figure
Paul Neergaard (1907–1987), Danish agronomist, mycologist and agriculturist
Preben Neergaard (1920–1990), Danish stage and film actor

See also 
Cabinet of Neergaard (disambiguation), multiple Danish cabinets
Neergaard (noble family), Danish noble family
Neergaard's sunbird, is a species of bird in the family Nectariniidae

Danish-language surnames